A.P. Bio is an American television sitcom that premiered on February 1, 2018, on NBC as a mid-season replacement. It aired on NBC for two seasons until June 13, 2019, and moved to Peacock for its subsequent seasons. The series is focused on the everyday lives of the faculty and students of the fictitious Whitlock High School. Mike O'Brien created the series and is a recurring writer. O'Brien is also one of the executive producers alongside Seth Meyers, Lorne Michaels, Andrew Singer, and Michael Shoemaker. Although set in Toledo, Ohio, it is primarily filmed in Los Angeles, California.

The series is centered around Jack Griffin, played by Glenn Howerton. Griffin is a philosophy professor who, after being fired from his Harvard position, returns to his hometown and picks up teaching Advanced Placement Biology all while trying to find opportunities to move out. A.P. Bio also features a cast of Lyric Lewis, Mary Sohn, Jean Villepique, Paula Pell, and Patton Oswalt.

A.P. Bio was met with mixed reviews on its first season, however following seasons have garnered a much more positive reception. In December 2021, the series was canceled after four seasons.

Plot
When disgraced Harvard philosophy professor Jack Griffin (Glenn Howerton) loses his dream job to his rival Miles Leonard (Tom Bennett), he is forced to return to his hometown of Toledo, Ohio, to work as an advanced placement biology teacher at Whitlock High School and live in his late mother's home. He makes it clear to his class that he will not be teaching them any biology. Realizing he has a room full of honor-roll students at his disposal, he decides to use them to get revenge on Miles. Eager to prove that he is still king of the castle, Principal Durbin (Patton Oswalt) struggles to keep Jack under control. In the second season, Jack uses his students to find out how the people of Toledo find happiness in their daily lives, to gather information for what he believes will be a bestselling book.

Cast

Main
Glenn Howerton as Dr. Jack Griffin
Tate Birchmore (season 3) and Olivier Paris (season 4) play younger versions of Jack
Lyric Lewis as Stef Duncan, a history teacher who is friends with Jack, Mary, and Michelle
Mary Sohn as Mary Wagner, an art teacher who is friends with Jack, Stef, and Michelle
Jean Villepique as Michelle Jones, a health and home economics teacher who is friends with Jack, Stef, and Mary
Michelle was played by Vanessa Bayer in the pilot episode
Tom Bennett as Miles Leonard, a philosophy scholar and professor at Stanford University who is Jack's rival and nemesis (season 1)
Patton Oswalt as Principal Ralph Durbin, the principal of Whitlock High School. While kind and working in the school's best interests, he is irresponsible and somewhat childlike. He plays the keyboard and sings, and was in a ska band in the 1990s.
Paula Pell as Helen Demarcus, Principal Durbin's secretary (seasons 2–4, recurring season 1)

Recurring
Jacob McCarthy as Devin, a quiet, brooding student who Jack calls "Prince of Darkness" (season 1)
Tucker Albrizzi as Colin McConnell (season 1)
Collette Wolfe as Meredith
Aparna Brielle as Sarika Sarkar, an over-achieving teacher's pet who usually opposes Jack's schemes
Nick Peine as Marcus Kasperak, the student council president who is in the AP Bio class. He is noted as being Jack's "least favorite student" and is constantly made fun of by him as a result.
Allisyn Snyder as Heather Wilmore, a mousy girl who acts as one of Jack's most trusted students/underlings
Eddie Leavy as Anthony Lewis, a sassy, effeminate boy
Charlie McCrackin as Coach Dick Novak, a gym teacher who coaches the Whitlock Rams football team
Jacob Houston as Victor Kozlowski, an extremely awkward and slow-talking boy
Spence Moore II as Dan Decker, a former bully who is forcibly enrolled into Jack's class as a punishment
Sari Arambulo as Grace
Marisa Baram as Marissa
David Neher as Dave Pugh, a science teacher who is constantly made fun of by the other teachers
Brendan Jennings as Dale, the school's custodian, later promoted to "head custodian" by Durbin in the second season
Yuyao Deng as Yuyao, a Chinese student in the AP Bio class
Patricia Belcher as Superintendent Bullard (seasons 1–2, 4)
Brad Morris as Keith (seasons 2–4)
Elizabeth Alderfer as Lynette,  a payroll accountant who befriends, and later dates, Jack (seasons 2–4)
Miguel Chavez as Eduardo, Victor's childhood best friend who transfers into the AP Biology class (seasons 2–4)
Jacob Timothy Manown as Caleb, an AP Bio student who is also in the drama club. He writes in his free time and is a fan of Principal Durbin's old ska band. (seasons 2–4)
Jaime Moyer as Joyce (seasons 2–4)
Cheryl Lynn Bowers as Rosemary Griffin (seasons 3–4)
Jane Morris as Rhonda (seasons 3–4)
Ashley Tapia and Chloe Csengery as Ashley (season 4)
Allison Bills as Trudy (season 4)
Hayley Marie Norman as Shayla Howard (season 4)

Guest stars

Episodes

Season 1 (2018)

Season 2 (2019)

Season 3 (2020)

Season 4 (2021)

Production

Development
The series was created by Mike O'Brien for NBC, to debut during the 2017–18 television season. On January 23, 2017, NBC officially ordered the pilot. The series was greenlit on May 11, 2017. It was announced the premiere of the series on February 1, 2018 at 8:30 p.m.

On May 8, 2018, NBC renewed the series for a second season, which premiered on March 7, 2019. On May 24, 2019, NBC canceled the series after two seasons. In July 2019, NBC reversed this decision and renewed the series for a third season, which premiered on NBCUniversal's streaming service, Peacock, on September 3, 2020. On December 17, 2020, Peacock renewed the series for a fourth season, which premiered on September 2, 2021. On December 6, 2021, Peacock canceled the series after four seasons.

Casting
In February 2017, it was announced that Mary Sohn and Lyric Lewis had joined the pilot's main cast. In March 2017, it was reported that Aparna Brielle, Glenn Howerton, Patton Oswalt, Nick Peine and Jacob McCarthy had joined the cast in their main roles. On June 12, 2017, it was announced that Tom Bennett had joined as a series regular. On August 1, 2017, it was announced that Jean Villepique had joined as a series regular.

Release

Marketing
On April 15, 2020, Peacock released the first official trailer for the series's third season.

Reception

Critical response
The first season holds a score of 66% with an average rating of 6.34/10 on the review aggregation website Rotten Tomatoes, based on 32 reviews. The site's critical consensus states, "A.P. Bio has some genuine laughs, but audiences have already seen plenty of authority figures behaving badly—and have a right to expect more from this promising premise and talented cast." Metacritic, which uses a weighted average, assigned the series a score of 59 out of 100 based on 17 critics.

Writing in The Hollywood Reporter, Daniel Fienberg commented that A.P. Bio had a good cast and "the only thing holding it back is the small quibble that it's not actually all that funny." Margaret Lyons of The New York Times called A.P. Bio "an abrasive sitcom that isn't merely unfunny, it's also deeply unpleasant." Jen Chaney of Vulture said the series had bright spots but was "conceptually played-out" overall.

Ratings

Overall

Season 1

Season 2

Home media
The first season of A.P. Bio was released on DVD in the United States on August 14, 2018 and in Australia on June 6, 2019

References

External links

2010s American high school television series
2010s American single-camera sitcoms
2010s American workplace comedy television series
2020s American high school television series
2020s American single-camera sitcoms
2020s American workplace comedy television series
2018 American television series debuts
2021 American television series endings
American television series revived after cancellation
English-language television shows
NBC original programming
Peacock (streaming service) original programming
Television series about educators
Television series by Broadway Video
Television series by Universal Television
Television shows set in Toledo, Ohio